Leonid "Tarzan" Fainberg also known as Ludwig Lyosha Fainberg (born January 3, 1958) is a Ukrainian mobster. Born in Odesa, Fainberg left the Soviet Union in the early 1980s for Israel, and moved to the United States following the fall of the Soviet Union. In the mid-1990s, Fainberg attempted to purchase a Soviet diesel submarine for use in drug smuggling for a Colombian cocaine cartel. Fainberg lived in Miami between 1990 and 1997 and owned a topless bar called Porky's, named for the movie. He was arrested and convicted of smuggling and racketeering and spent thirty months in jail before his trial, and was convicted.  he was in Panama, jailed and awaiting trial for pimping.

After being released by a judge from La Joyita Prison in Panama, the prosecutor appealed the release and wanted to retry the case. Authorities were going to re-arrest Tarzan and his accomplice (Tony Galeota). The two fled Panama into Costa Rica via boat and hid out until they could get their passports stamped which would allow them to leave Costa Rica. (Their story is detailed in the National Geographic series “Locked up Abroad” Season 13 Episode 10 “Miami Mobster Take Down”. Tarzan eventually fled to Cuba and returned to Moscow. He is featured in the Documentary “Operation Odessa”.  The story of how three hustlers schemed to sell a Soviet submarine to a Colombian drug cartel for $35 million.

References

1958 births
People from Odesa
Jewish American gangsters
Soviet emigrants to Israel
Soviet emigrants to the United States
Living people
21st-century American Jews
Drug traffickers